Cailly is a commune in the Seine-Maritime department in the Normandy region in northern France.

Geography
The commune is the source of the small river of the same name, the Cailly.

Population

Places of interest
 The church of St.Martin, dating from the twelfth century.
 Vestiges of a 12th-century castle.

See also
Communes of the Seine-Maritime department

References

Communes of Seine-Maritime